Ľubomír Faktor (born 18 March 1967) is a retired Slovak football midfielder.

References

1967 births
Living people
Slovak footballers
MŠK Žilina players
SK Slavia Prague players
FK Dukla Banská Bystrica players
ŠK Slovan Bratislava players
FC VSS Košice players
AS Trenčín players
Association football midfielders
Slovakia international footballers